Henry Carr (1941–2015) was an American track and field athlete.

Henry Carr may also refer to:
 Henry Carr (artist) (1894–1970), British landscape painter and war artist
 Henry Rawlingson Carr (1863–1945), Nigerian educator and administrator
 Henry Lascelles Carr (1844–1902), British newspaper proprietor and businessman
 Henry James Carr (1849–1929), American librarian
 Henry P. Carr (1904–1993), lawyer and politician from Philadelphia
 Henry William Carr (1777–1821), British Army soldier
 Henry Wilfrid Carr (1894–1962) British consular official in Zurich, basis for the central character in Tom Stoppard's play Travesties, also caricatured in James Joyce's novel Ulysses.

See also
 Harry Carr (disambiguation)
 Henry Carr Crusaders
 Father Henry Carr Catholic Secondary School, Toronto (Etobicoke), Ontario